Kevin Foote (born 22 March 1979) is a South African professional rugby union football coach, and a former player for the South African sevens national team. He is currently based in Australia and is currently serving as the interim head coach of the Melbourne Rebels, after previously serving as their defence coach.

Family and early life
Foote was born in Johannesburg, South Africa, where he attended the King Edward VII School. He began studying at Rand Afrikaans University in Johannesburg before transferring to Stellenbosch University in 1999.

Rugby career
He won 43 caps for the South African sevens team between 2002 and 2004, and captained the team. He played in eight IRB Sevens World Series tournaments during the 2002–03 and 2003–04 seasons.
In 2005, Foote had a brief stint with the Sunshine Coast Stingrays club in Queensland, Australia, before he returned to Cape Town to play for UCT (Ikeys), captaining the Ikeys team in the Western Province Super League from 2005 until 2007. After suffering a bad leg break, he retired from playing rugby and set his sights on coaching.

Coaching
Foote was an assistant coach at Ikeys from 2008 to 2010. He was promoted to head coach in 2011, guiding Ikeys to their first Varsity Cup title. Foote moved to Australia as a defensive consultant to the Western Force in 2013, and joined the Force full-time as the backs coach for the 2014 Super Rugby season. He was appointed, alongside David Wessels, as co-head coach of the Perth Spirit for the inaugural season of Australia's National Rugby Championship in 2014. After a two season gap, Foote returned to the head coach role for Perth Spirit in 2017.

In May 2021, Foote was named interim head coach of the Melbourne Rebels after the departure of David Wessels.

References

Living people
South African rugby union coaches
South African rugby union players
South Africa international rugby sevens players
Rugby union fly-halves
1979 births
Melbourne Rebels coaches
SWD Eagles players
Western Force coaches